Keiwan Jevar Ratliff (born April 19, 1981) is an American former football cornerback who played seven seasons in the National Football League (NFL) during the 2000s.  He played college football for the University of Florida, and was recognized as a consensus All-American.  He was drafted by the Cincinnati Bengals of the National Football League (NFL) in the second round of the 2004 NFL Draft, and also played for the Tampa Bay Buccaneers, Indianapolis Colts and Pittsburgh Steelers of the NFL.

Early years

Ratliff was born in Youngstown, Ohio in 1981.  He attended Whitehall-Yearling High School in Whitehall, Ohio, and was a letterman in high school football and basketball for the Whitehall-Yearling Rams.  Ratliff was a standout receiver on offense and cornerback on defense, he totaled forty-two catches for 760 yards and twelve touchdowns in 1997, and forty-six receptions for 880 yards and thirteen touchdowns in 1998.  He was an all-state selection as a senior in 1998, and received high school All-America honors from Super Prep, Prep Star, and National Blue Chips.

College career

Ratliff accepted an athletic scholarship to attend the University of Florida in Gainesville, Florida, where he played for coach Steve Spurrier and coach Ron Zook's Florida Gators football teams from 2000 to 2003.  During his four-season college career with the Gators, he set school records for punt return yards (860), interceptions in a season (9), and interceptions in a single game (3).  He was a first-team All-Southeastern Conference (SEC) selection in 2002 and 2003, and a consensus first-team All-American in 2003.  As a senior team captain, he was recognized as the SEC Defensive Player of the Year by Sporting News, and was picked by his teammates as the Gators' most valuable player.  Ratliff was inducted into the University of Florida Athletic Hall of Fame as a "Gator Great" in 2013.

Professional career

First stint with Bengals

He played in fifty-one games for the Bengals, and started in eight. His most productive season was in 2005, when he intercepted three passes and recovered a fumble. Ratliff was a key player in the 2005 Bengals turn around, helping Cincinnati end their losing drought, by securing their first winning season in 15 years, going (11-5), and capturing the 2005 AFC North Division Championship.

On September 26, 2007, the Bengals released him.

Tampa Bay Buccaneers

Ratliff signed with the Tampa Bay Buccaneers on November 12, 2007, but was waived on November 28, 2007.

Indianapolis Colts

The Indianapolis Colts claimed Ratliff off waivers on November 29, 2007.  He saw limited play with the team in the 2007 and 2008 seasons until he was cut by the Colts on September 20, 2008.  He was re-signed on October 8, 2008 but waived again on October 22.  He was once again re-signed on October 30 after cornerback Marlin Jackson was placed on injured reserve.

On December 18, 2008, Ratliff scored his first NFL career touchdown in a game against the Jacksonville Jaguars; he intercepted David Garrard and ran the ball 35 yards for the game-winning touchdown.  That game would wind up clinching the playoffs for Indianapolis that year.

Pittsburgh Steelers

An unrestricted free agent in the 2009 offseason, Ratliff signed with the Pittsburgh Steelers on May 1, 2009.  He was released on November 24.

Second stint with Bengals

Ratliff was re-signed by the Bengals prior to the playoffs on January 4, 2010 after defensive tackle Pat Sims was placed on injured reserve.  He was released on June 18.

Florida Tuskers

Ratliff was signed by the Florida Tuskers of the United Football League on September 1, 2010.

Third stint with Bengals

Ratliff was re-signed and added to the 53-man active roster on December 15, 2010.

Virginia Destroyers

Ratliff was added to the Destroyers' roster on September 9, 2011. He was placed on the injured reserve list on October 11.

See also

 2003 College Football All-America Team
 History of the Cincinnati Bengals
 List of Florida Gators football All-Americans
 List of Florida Gators in the NFL Draft
 List of Pittsburgh Steelers players
 List of University of Florida Athletic Hall of Fame members

References

Bibliography

 Carlson, Norm, University of Florida Football Vault: The History of the Florida Gators, Whitman Publishing, LLC, Atlanta, Georgia (2007).  .

External links
 Career stats
  Keiwan Ratliff – Cincinnati Bengals player profile
  Keiwan Ratliff – Florida Gators player profile

1981 births
Living people
All-American college football players
American football cornerbacks
American football return specialists
Cincinnati Bengals players
Florida Gators football players
Florida Tuskers players
Indianapolis Colts players
Pittsburgh Steelers players
Players of American football from Youngstown, Ohio
Tampa Bay Buccaneers players
Virginia Destroyers players